Frank Burnett Callaway (February 26, 1898 – September 17, 1987) was an American professional baseball infielder. Callaway was born in Knoxville in 1898. He is buried at Highland Memorial Cemetery in Knoxville, Tennessee.

References

Major League Baseball infielders
Philadelphia Athletics players
Baseball players from Knoxville, Tennessee
Tennessee Volunteers baseball players
burials in Tennessee
1898 births
1987 deaths